Balaskas is a surname. Notable people with the surname include:

Janet Balaskas, South African author and childbirth educator
Panayotis Balaskas (born 1946), Greek chess master
Peter A. Balaskas (born 1969), American author of speculative fiction
Xen Balaskas (1910–1994), South African cricketer